Wooden articular church of Hronsek is a Lutheran church situated in the village of Hronsek, in Slovakia.

Dimensions 
The church is in the form of cross with the longer arm measuring 23 m and the shorter arm measuring 18 m. The height of the church is 8 m.

History 
Construction of the church started on October 23, 1725 and finished in the autumn of 1726.

On July 7, 2008, the church along with seven other monuments was declared UNESCO world heritage site under the name "Wooden Churches of the Slovak part of the Carpathian Mountain Area".

References 

Wooden churches
World Heritage Sites in Slovakia
Churches in Slovakia
Wooden buildings and structures in Slovakia
18th-century churches in Slovakia